Marrony da Silva Liberato (born 5 February 1999), known simply as Marrony, is a Brazilian professional footballer who plays as a forward for Fluminense, on loan from Midtjylland.

Club career

Vasco da Gama
Born in Volta Redonda, Rio de Janeiro, Marrony joined Vasco da Gama's youth setup in 2015. He made his first team debut on 24 January 2018, coming on as a second-half substitute for Rildo in a 2–1 Campeonato Carioca away loss against Cabofriense.

Marrony made his Série A debut on 7 September 2018, replacing Yago Pikachu in a 2–1 loss at América Mineiro. He scored his first goal in the category on seventeen days later, netting the winner in a 2–1 home success over Bahia. 
On scoring his first professional goal, Marrony said: “I never imagined that a guy like me, a kid from the youth team, coming from Volta Redonda — I scored a goal against Bahia and the victory in addition to this was beautiful.” 

On 18 February 2019, after establishing himself as a starter, Marrony renewed his contract until 2023.

Atlético Mineiro
On 15 June 2020, Atlético Mineiro announced the signing of Marrony on a five-year contract, for a reported fee of €3.5 million.

Midtjylland
On 11 August 2021, Atlético announced the transfer of Marrony to Danish club Midtjylland for €4.5 million. He made his debut on 22 September in a 5–0 win over Kjellerup IF in the Danish Cup. His domestic league debut followed four days later in the 1–0 home win over Randers FC, coming on for compatriot Júnior Brumado in the 81st minute. Another four days followed before he made his first European appearance, replacing Gustav Isaksen in the 71st minute as Midtjylland lost 3–1 to Braga in the UEFA Europa League group stage.

Career statistics

Honours
Vasco da Gama
Taça Guanabara: 2019

Atlético Mineiro
 Campeonato Brasileiro Série A: 2021 
Campeonato Mineiro: 2020, 2021

Personal life
Marrony's cousin Ricardo Santos is also a footballer and a forward.

References

External links
Vasco da Gama profile 

1999 births
Living people
Brazilian footballers
Brazilian expatriate footballers
People from Volta Redonda
Association football forwards
Sportspeople from Rio de Janeiro (state)
Campeonato Brasileiro Série A players
Danish Superliga players
CR Vasco da Gama players
Clube Atlético Mineiro players
FC Midtjylland players
Fluminense FC players
Brazilian expatriate sportspeople in Denmark
Expatriate men's footballers in Denmark